is a 2010 puzzle action game developed by Japan Studio and published by Sony Computer Entertainment for the PlayStation 3 utilizing the PlayStation Move. The game is the sequel to the 2008 video game, Echochrome, and was released on December 21, 2010. The game's soundtrack holds the record for the longest piece of music ever composed for a video game, at one hour, fifteen minutes, and seven seconds.

Gameplay 
The main character is a mannequin made of shadows, which players must lead across a path made of shadows in each level. Players use the PlayStation Move motion controller and the PlayStation Eye camera to rotate levels and control light and shadows. The PlayStation Move controller functions as a light source in the game, and by pointing the light source at different angles to the objects in each level, players can manipulate the shadows of the objects to give the mannequin a path to the goal.

See also
Echoshift

References
Notes

Citation

External links
Official Site @ PlayStation.com

2010 video games
Perspective video games
PlayStation 3 games
PlayStation 3-only games
PlayStation Move-compatible games
PlayStation Move-only games
PlayStation Network games
Puzzle video games
Sony Interactive Entertainment games
Video game sequels
Video games developed in Japan
Video games scored by Hideki Sakamoto
Video games with user-generated gameplay content